Andreas Endresen (born 21 January 2003) is a Norwegian footballer currently playing as a forward for Vard Haugesund on loan from Haugesund.

Career statistics

Club

Notes

References

2003 births
Living people
People from Karmøy
Norwegian footballers
Norway youth international footballers
Association football forwards
Eliteserien players
FK Haugesund players
SK Vard Haugesund players
Sportspeople from Rogaland